Big Ten Tournament can refer to any Big Ten Conference sport that has a tournament or championship game:
 Big Ten Football Championship Game
 Big Ten men's basketball tournament
 Big Ten women's basketball tournament
 Big Ten baseball tournament
 Big Ten softball tournament
 Big Ten men's ice hockey tournament
 Big Ten men's soccer tournament
 Big Ten women's lacrosse tournament